Marguerite Jeanne Emilie Marguerite Lebrun ( Nivoit; October 12, 1878 - October 25, 1947) was the wife of Albert Lebrun, who was President of France from 1932 to 1940. She was a right wing activist and the founder of École des parents ("Parents School") in 1929, an education movement in France.

During her husband's presidency, Lebrun was "an outspoken supporter of traditional roles for women." She was also a journalist who wrote under the pseudonym Vérine.

Together Lebrun and her husband had two children: son Jean Lebrun and daughter Marie Lebrun. Jean Lebrun married Bernadette Marin, the daughter of a retired army captain, in the town hall in Rambouillet, France, on 17 October 1932.

She was the "godmother" of the legendary ocean liner SS Normandie and the ship Paul Doumer, named for the previous French president.

She wrote God, Work, Family, and Fatherland in 1941.

References

1878 births
1947 deaths
Spouses of French presidents